Thanh Hà may refer to:

Thanh Hà District
Thanh Hà (singer)